Charles Napoleon Moore (1882–1967) was an American mathematician at Bowling Green State University who worked on convergence factors.

He was an Invited Speaker at the ICM in 1932 in Zürich.

Publications

References

External links

20th-century American mathematicians
1882 births
1967 deaths
Harvard University alumni